No one is illegal is a loosely connected international network, which advocates for refugees and migrants present in a country unlawfully. Activists in the network take initiatives in favor of migrants who stay in a country illegally and are at risk of deportation. The network has started a campaign and held rallies to bring wider attention to the situation of refugees. The campaign initially began in Germany as No Person Is Illegal (German: Kein Mensch ist illegal or kmii) and has spread to other countries, including Canada and Belgium.
No one is illegal questions the idea of citizenship as a legal condition for access to and participation in the socio-political sphere.

Germany

History 
No Person Is Illegal was founded in 1997 at the "documenta X" art exhibition in Kassel. After a few weeks, thousands of individuals joined as well as the 200 groups and organisations that had joined them in appealing to "help immigrants begin and continue their journeys towards obtaining work and documentation, medical care, education and training, and to assure accommodation and physical survival" regardless of their immigration status. The founding followed the death of deportee Aamir Ageeb at the hands of the German Federal Police. In the wake of Ageeb's death, the "Deportation-Class" campaign set its aims towards airlines that took part in deportations. The campaign culminated in a 2001 online demonstration in conjunction with Libertad. No Person Is Illegal and "Deportation-Class" have drawn the attention of Germany's annual "Constitutional Protection Report" due to purported connections with "left-wing extremism".

Switzerland
Switzerland Bildung für Alle (Education for All) organization has its own specific task which is attempting to achieve permanent legal stay for immigrants. the organization stated School for all like Autonome Schule (Autonomous School)

Autonomous School Zurich 
Autonomous School Zurich is a school for all immigrants.

Canada

A NOII collective of organizations has been established in a number of Canadian cities, including Winnipeg, Vancouver, Toronto, Halifax, Fredericton, Ottawa, Montreal, and London. Activist Harsha Walia is an organizer for the Vancouver chapter, while Yanisa Wu, Kelly Campbell, Sherry Viloria, Evan Macintosh, Jayelyn Rae, Hazim Ismail, and Mitchell van Ineveld organize for the Winnipeg chapter.

References 

AutorInnenkollektiv (2000): Ohne Papiere in Europa. Illegalisierung der Migration. Selbstorganisation und Unterstützungsprojekte in Europa. 
cross the border (Hg.) (1999): kein mensch ist illegal. Ein Handbuch zu einer Kampagne. 
 Gerda Heck: ›Illegale Einwanderung‹. Eine umkämpfte Konstruktion in Deutschland und den USA. Edition DISS Band 17. Münster 2008.  (Interview heiseonline 10. November 2008)

External links 

 Homepage von kein mensch ist illegal
 NOII Montreal, Ottawa, Toronto and Vancouver

Human rights organizations
Migration-related organizations
Protests in Germany